The 1985–86 season was Liverpool Football Club's 94th season in existence and their 24th consecutive season in the First Division. This was Kenny Dalglish’s first season as manager. At 34 he was player manager, and with several players in their last seasons as players. The change to the new team would take time during the season, but it ended with them winning the double of the League and FA Cup, and reaching the League Cup semi-finals. It was the fifth time that the league and FA Cup double had been achieved in English football.

As there was a ban on English clubs participating in the European competitions after the Heysel disaster, there was the ScreenSport Super Cup replacing it. As the competition did not end until the 1986-87 season, Liverpool reached the final after getting through the group, and the semi-finals.

Squad

Goalkeepers

  Bob Bolder
  Bruce Grobbelaar
  Chris Pile

Defenders

  Gary Ablett
  Jim Beglin
  Gary Gillespie
  Alan Hansen
  Steve Nicol
  Alan Kennedy
  Mark Lawrenson
  John McGregor
  Phil Neal (Joined Bolton in December 1985)

Midfielders

  Craig Johnston
  Sammy Lee
  Kevin MacDonald
  Steve McMahon
  Jan Mølby
  Mark Seagraves
  John Wark
  Ronnie Whelan

Attackers

  Ian Rush
  Kenny Dalglish
  Paul Walsh

League table

Results

First Division

FA Cup

Final

League Cup

Super Cup

References
LFC History.net – Games for the 1985–86 season
Liverweb - Games for the 1985–86 season

Liverpool F.C. seasons
Liverpool
English football championship-winning seasons